Guus Hiddink (born 8 November 1946) is a Dutch former football manager and professional player. He enjoyed a long career playing as a midfielder in his native Netherlands. Retired as player in 1982, Hiddink went into management, leading both clubs and countries from across the globe to achieve various titles and feats. With PSV Eindhoven he won the European Champions Cup, the predecessor of the UEFA Champions League.

Playing career
Hiddink was born in Varsseveld and started his career as a player in the youth side of amateur club SC Varsseveld. He turned professional after signing on for Dutch club De Graafschap in 1967. Hiddink played at the Doetinchem club under manager Piet de Visser. In 1973, Hiddink and manager de Visser earned promotion to the Eredivisie, the top league in Dutch football. Ever since, the careers of the two Dutchmen have intersected: De Visser scouted numerous South American players, such as PSV players Ronaldo, Romário (who played under Hiddink at PSV from 1988 until 1990) and former Chelsea defender Alex, for Hiddink's PSV. Also, De Visser, in his role as personal advisor to Roman Abramovich, was influential in bringing Hiddink to the Russia national team and more recently to Chelsea as caretaker manager following the dismissal of Brazilian Luiz Felipe Scolari. He spent most of his playing career at De Graafschap, including three years under de Visser, and remains a fan of the club. He joined PSV in 1970, but after failing to win a permanent position in the team, he rejoined De Graafschap after just one year and remained there until 1977. In 1981, he rejoined De Graafschap and retired a year later. He generally played as a midfielder during his playing days.

Managerial career

Early club career

Having honed his coaching skills as an assistant manager, Hiddink took over the managerial role at PSV Eindhoven in March 1987 after also holding the assistant manager position for the club from 1983 to March 1987. Hiddink took over in March 1987, whilst the team was trailing by three points behind Ajax with ten matches remaining in the league. PSV, however, managed to win the championship six points ahead of Ajax. 

It was at PSV where he led the team to its first ever European Cup triumph in 1988 (and The Treble), affirming the Eindhoven club's ranking as one of the three giants of Dutch football, alongside rivals Ajax and Feyenoord. He also won three Eredivisie titles with the club in between 1987 and 1990. "Hiddink will never take all the credit for himself, he will also involve his staff in it. That adds to the strong sense of unity. Hiddink has final responsibility, but always shares it with the team around him. He is a real team player," said Berry van Aerle, who was coached by Hiddink in two separate periods with PSV.

Overall Hiddink's PSV side won three consecutive Eredivisie titles, three consecutive KNVB Cups and the European Cup in the historic Treble-winning season of 1987–88. 

Hiddink also had a coaching stint at Turkish club Fenerbahçe in 1990, but was dismissed after one year, later joining Spanish giants Valencia.

Netherlands national team
Hiddink faced his biggest managerial challenge when he took over the reins of the Netherlands national team on 1 January 1995, where he took charge of a team of talented individuals continually racked by internal arguments and disputes. His usual 4–4–2 tactic of deploying wingers backed-up by central midfielders resulted in goals from defensive midfielders such as Philip Cocu and Edgar Davids. Hiddink took a firm approach to the team, an example of which was demonstrated at UEFA Euro 1996 when Edgar Davids was sent home after an argument with Hiddink.The team finished in the quarter-finals during UEFA Euro 1996. 

He was able to prevent further internal conflict in the 1998 FIFA World Cup where his team played some of the more entertaining football in that tournament. The team beat Argentina in the quarter-finals 2–1, then suffered a defeat at the hands of Brazil on penalties in the semi-final -- later finishing fourth. This loss signalled an end of another era for Hiddink, as he resigned as Netherlands national coach soon after, where he was then appointed manager of Spanish giants Real Madrid.

Real Madrid and Real Betis
Hiddink became manager of Spanish La Liga side Real Madrid in the summer of 1998, replacing Jupp Heynckes, but poor league form and off-pitch remarks about the board and finances of the club prompted his termination in February 1999.

Hiddink then took over the reins at Spanish club Real Betis in 2000 for the rest of the season. His time at Real Betis ended badly, with Hiddink being sacked by May 2000.

In the summer of 2000, rumours were rife over his future, with Scottish club Celtic among the clubs named as a potential destination. The temptation to manage another World Cup-bound international team proved irresistible to him, however, as he agreed to coach the South Korea national team on 1 January 2001.

South Korea
Hiddink became manager of South Korea in January 2001. Success did not come easily with a team that had appeared in five-straight World Cups but had yet to win a single match. South Korea was one of the host nations for the 2002 FIFA World Cup tournament, along with Japan. There was an expectation that the hosts would progress to the second round of the tournament and it was clearly expressed that Hiddink's team was expected to perform to that standard as well.

Hiddink's first year in charge was not met with favourable reviews from the South Korean press, as he was often spotted together with his girlfriend when some felt he should instead have been taking charge of the team. After a 2–1 loss to the United States Gold Cup team in January 2002, he was criticized again for not taking his job seriously. Nevertheless, the team he assembled was a cohesive unit. However, Hiddink began focusing on physical fitness for players during training in preparation for the World Cup later that year.

In the World Cup itself, the South Korea team achieved its first ever victory in the first stage (2–0, against Poland), and after a 1–1 draw with the U.S. and a further 1–0 victory against heavily favoured Portugal, the South Korea team qualified for the second round.

Their second round opponents were Italy, who they defeated 2–1 on the golden goal rule. The Korean public then began to dream of a semi-final berth, a dream that was realized after defeating Spain on penalties in the quarter-final. This surpassed the record of their North Korean counterparts 36 years before, who had beaten Italy to reach the quarter-finals.

The South Korea team's run was halted by Germany, managed by Rudi Völler, in the semi-finals. As with the Netherlands team four years before in France, Hiddink led his team into fourth place after a 3–2 defeat to Turkey in the third-place playoff.

Prior to the tournament, football pundits and fans alike never expected this level of success. Many in South Korea were overjoyed when the country reached the semi-finals of the 2002 World Cup. Hiddink became the first-ever person to be given honorary South Korean citizenship. In addition, other rewards soon followed — a private villa in Jeju-do island; free flights for life with Korean Air and Asiana Airlines, free taxi rides, among others. The World Cup stadium in Gwangju, where South Korea qualified for the semi-finals, was renamed Guus Hiddink Stadium in his honour shortly after the tournament. His hometown, where a Guuseum was set up, became a popular stopover for South Koreans visiting the Netherlands. The Guuseum is a museum established by his relatives, in Varsseveld, to honor Hiddink.

PSV
Hiddink chose to return to his native country and took over the coaching duties at PSV Eindhoven in 2002. During his second spell with PSV, Hiddink won three Dutch league titles (2002–03, 2004–05, and 2005–06), the 2005 Dutch Cup and the 2003 Dutch Super Cup. In Europe, the 2004–05 Champions League led to PSV's first ever appearance in the semi-final of the tournament since it adopted its current format in 1992–93 (PSV won the European Cup, the predecessor to the modern Champions League, in 1988, with Hiddink as coach). PSV narrowly lost the semi-final to Milan, on away goals.

In the 2005–06 Champions League season, PSV made it through the group stage, but was eliminated in the first knockout round, having lost five of its starting 11 (Park Ji-sung to Manchester United, Lee Young-pyo to Tottenham Hotspur, Mark van Bommel to Barcelona, Johann Vogel to Milan and Wilfred Bouma to Aston Villa) to transfers. This period at PSV made Hiddink the most successful Dutch coach in history, with six Dutch League titles and four Dutch Cups, surpassing the record of Rinus Michels. Hiddink left the club in June 2006.

Australia
On 22 July 2005, Hiddink became manager of the Australia national team. He announced he would manage both PSV and Australia at the same time.

In the play-offs held with Uruguay in Montevideo on 12 November and in Sydney on 16 November 2005, both home teams won 1–0. Australia went on to win 4–2 on penalties — the first time Australia had qualified for the finals in 32 years, and the first time that any team had qualified through winning a penalty shoot-out.

Hiddink was a popular figure in Australia and was referred to affectionately as "Aussie Guus." A telling example of the public affection for him was the Socceroo fans chant of "Goooooooooooos!" during moments of play. Slogans for the Socceroos' 2006 World Cup campaign were "No Guus, No Glory," "Guus for P.M." and "In Guus We Trust," as well as the play on words of the famous taunt "Guus your Daddy?". During the World Cup, a Sydney newspaper started a humorous campaign to lure him away from Russia by proposing a national "Guus tax" to pay his wages. More seriously, his reputation was enhanced by his transformation of the national side, with pundits focusing on the improvement to Australia's defence. He is credited with turning a team which conceded many goals under Frank Farina into a solid defensive unit which only conceded one goal away from home to both Uruguay and the Netherlands. Hiddink's assistants at Australia were Dutch legend Johan Neeskens and former Australia international Graham Arnold.

The Socceroos defeated Japan 3–1 during their first game in the 2006 World Cup final stages, with Tim Cahill scoring two goals (84', 89') and John Aloisi scoring one (92') all in the last eight minutes to claim their first World Cup goals and victory ever. An early controversial call by the Egyptian referee that awarded a goal to the Japanese team, despite an apparent foul to Australia goalkeeper Mark Schwarzer, had the Australians playing catch up until the last eight minutes. After scoring the first goal, Cahill was lucky to get away with a potential foul when he tripped Japan's Yūichi Komano, who had dribbled into the Australian penalty area. The referee missed the incident, and Cahill then broke to score the second on the counter. FIFA's spokesman for refereeing Andreas Werz said that while Japan's first goal was irregular, Egyptian referee Essam Abdel Fatah should also have given Japan a penalty.

Australia followed the match against Japan with a 2–0 loss to Brazil, leaving the Socceroos needed at least a draw against Croatia in their last group match to qualify for the knockout stages for the first time in its history. After a match fraught with controversy and erroneous decisions from referee Graham Poll, including an unprecedented three yellow cards given to the same Croatian player, ironically the Australian-born Josip Šimunić, the game ended 2–2, and the Socceroos had their draw thanks to a goal from Harry Kewell to level the game with minutes to spare.

In the second round, Italy beat Australia 1–0. After controversially sending off Italian defender Marco Materazzi in the 55th minute, Spanish referee Luis Medina Cantalejo awarded Italy's Fabio Grosso a controversial penalty kick eight seconds from the end of normal time, which was converted by Francesco Totti. This put Australia out of the World Cup, marking the official end of Hiddink's tenure as Australia's national coach.

Russia

On 10 April 2006, Hiddink announced on Dutch television that he would take over as manager of the Russia national team. He signed a two-year contract in April 2006 worth €2 million a year. His duties for Russia started after managing Australia during the 2006 World Cup.

Russia's Euro 2008 qualification hopes came into question after a 2–1 loss to Israel. However, after a win against Andorra, and England losing out to Croatia on the last match day, Russia and Hiddink secured qualification for the final stages of Euro 2008. At the tournament, the Russians managed to reach the semi-finals with victories against the Netherlands in the quarter-finals and defending champions Greece in the group stage.

Piet de Visser, a former head scout of Hiddink's club PSV and now a personal assistant to Roman Abramovich at Chelsea, recommended Hiddink to the Chelsea owner, following the departure of Avram Grant at the end of the 2007–08 Premier League season. In March 2008, however, Hiddink had already chosen to exercise the two-year extension with Russia, keeping him in the national team's head coaching role until 2010.

In November 2009, Russia was defeated by Slovenia in a 2010 World Cup qualifying play-off, casting doubt on future ambitions. On 13 February 2010, it was confirmed that Hiddink would leave the position when his contract expired on 30 June.

Chelsea
After the sacking of Chelsea's manager, the Brazilian Luiz Felipe Scolari, during the 2008–09 Premier League season, Chelsea confirmed on 11 February 2009 that Hiddink would become Scolari's replacement until the end of the season, whilst continuing his duties with Russia. Hiddink's first game in charge was a 1–0 away victory against Aston Villa at Villa Park. His first game in charge at Stamford Bridge was a 1–0 victory over Juventus in the Champions League knockout stage. Success continued in the form of a 3–1 away victory against Liverpool—commentators stated that Hiddink had rejuvenated Chelsea following Scolari's departure. After knocking Liverpool out of the competition, Hiddink went on to take Chelsea to the semi-finals of the Champions League, where the club was eliminated on the away goals rule to eventual winners Barcelona; a 93rd minute Barça goal in a 1–1 controversial draw at Stamford Bridge, preceded by a 0–0 at Camp Nou, sealed Chelsea's fate.

Hiddink only lost once during his tenure as Chelsea manager, a 1–0 loss to Tottenham Hotspur at White Hart Lane, where Luka Modrić scored the only goal of the match. As it turned out, even winning every league game in charge would not have been enough to see Hiddink secure the Premier League title. In the final home game of the season, in which Chelsea beat Blackburn Rovers 2–0, Chelsea home fans chanted Hiddink's name throughout the match and called for Chelsea owner Roman Abramovich to "sign him up" on a permanent basis. Hiddink's highly positive reception highlighted the Chelsea fans' appreciation of the manager. He marked an end to his Premier League campaign with a thrilling 3–2 away win over Sunderland.

In his last game as interim coach of Chelsea, he won the 2009 FA Cup by beating Everton 2–1 at Wembley.
He was visibly pleased at winning the Cup, and in subsequent interviews claimed it was one of his biggest achievements. Even though throughout his tenure at Chelsea various players asked him to stay, including captain John Terry, Michael Ballack and Petr Čech, Hiddink always stated that he intended to return to his post with Russia. As a parting gift, the Chelsea players gave him an engraved watch and a shirt signed by all of the players.

Turkey
On 16 February 2010, Turkish Football Federation President Mahmut Özgener and Hiddink held talks in Amsterdam. Hiddink agreed to coach the Turkey national team after his contract with Russia expired on 30 June 2010. His contract with Turkey began on 1 August 2010, and his staff included assistant manager Oğuz Çetin and goalkeeping coach Engin İpekoğlu.

On 11 August 2010, Turkey defeated Romania 2–0 in an international friendly in Istanbul. Emre Belözoğlu gave Turkey the lead in the 82nd minute after converting a spot kick, followed by Arda Turan doubling the scoreline after netting from 30 yards out. During his spell as head coach, Hiddink was repeatedly criticized by the media for the size of his salary, for not basing himself in Turkey and intermittently visiting the country for games and preparation camps, and for the alleged fact that he failed to grasp the emotional character of the players and forced them into a cold, rational and overly systematic playing mentality. He resigned after Turkey failed to qualify for Euro 2012 when they lost to Croatia 3–0 aggregate in the playoffs.

Anzhi Makhachkala
On 17 February 2012, Hiddink agreed an 18-month deal to manage Russian club Anzhi Makhachkala, his first permanent club post in six years. In his second season, he led the team to the bronze medal in the Russian Premier League, and Anzhi made it to the round of 16 of the UEFA Europa League for the first time. In the quarter-finals of the same competition, having gone down to ten men 55 minutes into the second leg against Newcastle United, Anzhi came close to going through when Mbark Boussoufa's free kick hit the post before Papiss Cissé headed home the winner in the last seconds of the tie, meaning the Magpies won 1–0 on aggregate. This was the second time that the English side have knocked out a team managed by Hiddink in the competition, having beaten his PSV side 3–2 on aggregate in the quarter-finals of the 2003–04 season. He announced his retirement at the end of the 2012–13 season on 28 November 2012, but later changed his mind.

On 11 June 2013, Hiddink decided to extend his contract by one more year at Anzhi. Just two games into the 2013–14 Russian Premier League season after a 2–1 defeat at Dynamo Moscow, however, he unexpectedly resigned on 22 July 2013. He said he left because he completed his mission, which he said was to develop Anzhi in a way that it could progress without him.

Return to Netherlands national team
On 28 March 2014, it was announced that Hiddink would return to manage the Dutch national team after Louis van Gaal would step down following the 2014 World Cup. Hiddink agreed to manage the team up to UEFA Euro 2016, with Danny Blind and Ruud van Nistelrooy assisting him and Blind to eventually replace him. His second spell in charge of the team began with a 2–0 defeat to Italy in a friendly on 4 September 2014, with both goals conceded and a red card received within the first ten minutes of the match. Five days later, the Dutch began their UEFA Euro 2016 qualifying campaign with a 2–1 defeat away to the Czech Republic, a 3–1 victory against Kazakhstan and a 2–0 defeat in the hands of Iceland a month later.

The 2015 calendar year began in March with a match against Turkey, ending in a 1–1 draw. On 29 June 2015, Hiddink left his position. Two days later, he was succeeded by his assistant, Danny Blind. It was unknown for a long time whether Hiddink was fired or left his position voluntarily, but on 21 November 2015, he said, whilst on vacation in France, that he was fired from the post.

Return to Chelsea
On 19 December 2015, Hiddink was appointed first-team manager of English side Chelsea until the end of the 2015–16 season, following the dismissal of José Mourinho; he joined the club in the same capacity he did back in 2009. After being made interim manager, Hiddink spoke, saying he was "excited to return to Stamford Bridge" and "I am looking forward to working with the players and staff at this great club and especially renewing my wonderful relationship with the Chelsea fans." After the home draw against Stoke City, Hiddink set a new record for the longest unbeaten streak as a new manager in the Premier League with 12 games unbeaten.

Chelsea ended the season in tenth place in the Premier League, climbing six positions from 16th upon Hiddink's arrival.

China U21
On 10 September 2018, Hiddink took over the China under-21 national team but was fired in September 2019 after a string of disappointing results, culminating with a 2–0 defeat against Vietnam under-22 men's team. The coach of the Vietnamese team coincidentally was Park Hang-seo, assistant coach of South Korea's national team in the 2002 World Cup under Hiddink.

Curaçao and retirement from management
On 21 August 2020, Hiddink was appointed manager of the Curaçao national team.

After failing to lead the nation to 2022 FIFA World Cup qualification, Hiddink contracted COVID-19 in 2021, prompting Patrick Kluivert to step in as interim manager of the team. On 9 September 2021, Hiddink officially stepped down as head coach of Curaçao and announced his managerial retirement at the age of 74.

Temporary end of retirement for a return to Australia 
Hiddink came out of retirement to assist his former Socceroos assistant, Graham Arnold, for Australia's two-match friendly series against New Zealand, as regular assistant coach René Meulensteen was scouting the Socceroos' Qatar 2022 opponents in Europe.

The temporary arrangement formed part of the Socceroos' centenary celebrations. Hiddink was on the Australian bench for their 1-0 win in Brisbane on September 22, 2022, and in Auckland three days later.

Tax evasion
In February 2007, Hiddink was given a six-month suspended jail sentence and fined €45,000 after being found guilty of tax evasion by a Dutch court. Prosecutors had demanded a ten-month prison sentence for Hiddink, who was accused of evading €1.4 million in Dutch taxes by claiming to be a resident of Belgium from 2002 to 2003. The Dutch Tax Intelligence and Detection Service claimed that he had not spent enough nights at his Belgian house which he had stated was his primary address. Hiddink denied this accusation.

Managerial statistics

Honours

Player
De Graafschap
 Tweede Divisie: 1969

San Jose Earthquakes
 North American Soccer League Southern Division: runner-up 1977

Manager
PSV Eindhoven
 Eredivisie: 1986–87, 1987–88, 1988–89, 2002–03, 2004–05, 2005–06
 KNVB Cup: 1987–88, 1988–89, 1989–90, 2004–05
 Johan Cruyff Shield: 2003
 European Cup: 1987–88

Netherlands
 FIFA World Cup Fourth place: 1998

Real Madrid
 Intercontinental Cup: 1998

South Korea
 FIFA World Cup Fourth place: 2002

Russia
 UEFA European Championship Semi-finalist: 2008

Chelsea
 FA Cup: 2008–09

Individual
 Order of Sport Merit: Cheongnyong Medal
 AFC Coach of the Year: 2002
 World Soccer World Manager of the Year: 2002
 Dutch Sports Coach of the Year (all sports): 2002, 2005
 Rinus Michels Award: 2005, 2006
 Coach of the Year in Russia: 2008
 In 2005 Hiddink received an honorary doctorate by the University of Seoul
 The De Graafschap mascot is named Guus in honor of Hiddink who was previously associated with the team as a player and as a manager.
 The Gwangju World Cup Stadium was renamed the Guus Hiddink Stadium in honor of Hiddink's performance at the 2002 FIFA World Cup.
 Hiddink was named an honorary citizen of Seoul after reaching the 2002 FIFA World Cup semi-finals.
 Hiddink was named an honorary citizen of Eindhoven after winning his sixth Eredivisie title with PSV in 2006.
 Hiddink was put on a stamp by Australia Post following the 2006 FIFA World Cup.
 Hiddink was given a lifetime achievement award by the Royal Dutch Football Association in 2007. It was only the third such award ever given following those received by Rinus Michels and Johan Cruijff.
 Sports Illustrated Team of the Decade: 2009

References

Bibliography
 Marc Bennetts, Football Dynamo — Modern Russia and the People's Game, Virgin Books, (15 May 2008),

External links

 Guus Hiddink Foundation
 
 Managerial career at Mackolik.com 

1946 births
Living people
People from Oude IJsselstreek
Dutch footballers
Association football midfielders
De Graafschap players
PSV Eindhoven players
NEC Nijmegen players
Washington Diplomats (NASL) players
San Jose Earthquakes (1974–1988) players
Eerste Divisie players
Eredivisie players
North American Soccer League (1968–1984) players
Dutch expatriate footballers
Dutch expatriate sportspeople in the United States
Expatriate soccer players in the United States
Dutch football managers
PSV Eindhoven managers
Fenerbahçe football managers
Valencia CF managers
Netherlands national football team managers
Real Madrid CF managers
Real Betis managers
South Korea national football team managers
Australia national soccer team managers
Russia national football team managers
Chelsea F.C. managers
Turkey national football team managers
FC Anzhi Makhachkala managers
Curaçao national football team managers
Eredivisie managers
Süper Lig managers
La Liga managers
Premier League managers
Russian Premier League managers
UEFA Euro 1996 managers
1998 FIFA World Cup managers
2001 FIFA Confederations Cup managers
2002 FIFA World Cup managers
2006 FIFA World Cup managers
UEFA Euro 2008 managers
UEFA Champions League winning managers
FA Cup winning managers
Honoured Coaches of Russia
Rinus Michels Award winners
Dutch expatriate football managers
Dutch expatriate sportspeople in Turkey
Dutch expatriate sportspeople in Spain
Dutch expatriate sportspeople in South Korea
Dutch expatriate sportspeople in Australia
Dutch expatriate sportspeople in Russia
Dutch expatriate sportspeople in England
Dutch expatriate sportspeople in China
Expatriate football managers in Turkey
Expatriate football managers in Spain
Expatriate football managers in South Korea
Expatriate soccer managers in Australia
Expatriate football managers in Russia
Expatriate football managers in England
Expatriate football managers in China
Footballers from Gelderland